The Luna Jacal or Luna's Jacal was the residence of Gilberto Luna, a Mexican pioneer farmer in the area of Texas that would become Big Bend National Park. The house backs up to a large boulder. A heavier line of poles extends the length of the jacal. The roof was made of ocotillo branches weighted down with earth and stones, presently replaced with an inappropriate soil-cement roof. Luna raised a large family at the jacal, peacefully coexisting with otherwise hostile Comanche who used the Alamo Creek area as a war trail. Luna died there in 1947 at age 108 or 109.

Luna's jacal was placed on the National Register of Historic Places on November 8, 1974. It was restored in 1971 and again stabilized in 1983.

Luna and the Comanche War Trail
The write-up for the National Register of Historic Places  states

While a popular story associated with the jacal, some doubt exists that Gilberto Luna lived at the jacal while the Comanche War Trail was active.
The NRHP write-up uses the Road Guide to Paved and Improved Dirt Roads of Big Bend National Park as source material, originally published in 1980. As late as the 1987 revision of the guide this same verbiage is intact, but in the 2010 revision of the guide, the verbiage had been removed.

In the book Exploring The Big Bend Country an interview by Peter Koch with a grandson of Luna, Demencio C. Luna Jr., puts Luna's arrival at Alamo Wash after the close of the Comanche Trail:

The book A Guide to Hispanic Texas  says Luna's Jacal was built about 1900, which agrees with Gilberto Luna's grandson's claim, and years after the last band of Comanches moved to the Fort Sill reservation in Oklahoma in 1874–75.

See also

National Register of Historic Places listings in Big Bend National Park
National Register of Historic Places listings in Brewster County, Texas

References

Houses on the National Register of Historic Places in Texas
Houses in Brewster County, Texas
National Register of Historic Places in Big Bend National Park
1890 establishments in Texas
Buildings and structures completed in 1890